Bartsiella is a monotypic genus of flowering plants, initially classified in Scrophulariaceae, and now within the broomrape family Orobanchaceae. It contains a unique species, Bartsiella rameauana.

Etymology
Bartsiella was named after Johann Bartsch (Latinized as Johannes Bartsius, 1709-1738), a botanist of Königsberg. It refers to another genus of Orobanchaceae, Bartsia, named for Johann Bartsch by his associate Carl Linnaeus.

References 

Orobanchaceae genera
Parasitic plants
Monotypic Lamiales genera
Plants described in 1996
Orobanchaceae